The Trail Daily Times is the local daily newspaper of Trail, British Columbia, Canada. It is owned by Victoria-based Black Press, the largest publisher of weekly newspapers in British Columbia.

The Daily Times is the paper of record for Trail and several surrounding communities. It publishes Tuesdays through Fridays. It has carried several different names since being founded as the Trail Creek News in 1895.

See also
List of newspapers in Canada

References

External links
Trail Daily Times| – Official website.

Publications established in 1895
Daily newspapers published in British Columbia
1895 establishments in British Columbia
Black Press newspapers
Trail, British Columbia